Kaka District is a district of Ahal Province, Turkmenistan.

In ancient times the area was a fertile agricultural plain to the north of the Kopet Dag mountain range. A number of important Bronze Age sites exist in the area, such as Ulug Depe and Abiward.

References

Districts of Turkmenistan
Ahal Region